Alfred Schmidt (1892 – 23 November 1965) was a German architect. His work was part of the architecture event in the art competition at the 1936 Summer Olympics.

References

1892 births
1965 deaths
20th-century German architects
Olympic competitors in art competitions
Place of birth missing